Krishna Babu is a 1999 Indian Telugu-language drama film, produced by Chanti Addala under the Srinivasa Productions banner and directed by Muthyala Subbaiah. It stars Nandamuri Balakrishna, Meena, Raasi  and music composed by Koti. It was the 75th film of Balakrishna as an actor.

Plot
Krishna Babu is the head of the village Krishnapuram, whose word is an ordinance to the entire village. He stays along with his maternal uncle Chandraiah. Krishna Babu is in love with a beautiful girl Rama, the daughter of the headmaster of the village. Sarvarayudu is the step-maternal uncle of Krishna Babu, who has a family feud with Krishna Babu because he always gives a tough fight to him. Vijay younger brother of Krishna Babu studying at Hyderabad falls in love with his classmate Shilpa. Meantime, Krishna Babu and Rama get engaged, during that time Rama's uncle, who is a jailor interrupts and reveals that Krishna Babu is a murderer and was in jail for his criminal offense.

Now Krishna Babu elaborates on his past, his father was Zamindar of the village, who was a flirt and started having a lady as a keep in his own house. Both of them have a child now-other than Vijay. But Krishna Babu treats him as his own. Sarvarayudu is the brother of the keep who plans to kill Krishna Babu's mother by poisoning but by mistake, Krishna Babu's father dies. The blame is put on Krishna Babu and he is sent to 14 years of imprisonment. Seeing this, his mother also dies of a heart attack. Meanwhile, Sarvarayudu murders his sister, also Vijay becomes an orphan, Krishna Babu instructs Chandraiah to take his responsibility. After 14 years he returns to his village to take the reins of the kind-hearted leader of Krishnapuram by winning the goodwill of the village men. After knowing this, everyone sheds tears about Krishna Babu and the engagement is over on a happy note. Now Sarvarayudu is on fire seeing him, so he kidnaps Rama. Krishna Babu goes to her rescue but in the fight, he kills Rama by mistake. Krishna Babu is again sent to jail for seven years. By this time, Vijay is sent to the US for higher studies. Before leaving he explains to Shilpa that he cannot knit her and convinces her to perform nuptial with someone else.

Meantime the ex-warden of Krishna Babu comes and meets him who is the father of Shilpa. For good conduct in his jail, Krishna Babu is released much earlier, and before reaching home he meets his ex-warden on his death bed, who before dying, leaves Shilpa's responsibility to Krishna Babu. So he takes Shilpa to the village. As Krishna Babu is mentally wrought with the agony of struggles he is going through, Shilpa makes him the man with a smile by helping him to regain the composure of a normal man. Village men start questioning the relationship between Krishna Babu and Shilpa. Upon Chandraiah's request, Krishna Babu and Shilpa prepare to marry. At the same time, Vijay returns from abroad get shocked looks at Shilpa, and decide to sacrifice his love for his brother. All friends of Vijay are invited to the marriage and they reveal the truth to Krishna Babu. Finally, Krishna Babu makes the marriage of Vijay and Shilpa, eliminates Sarvarayudu, and implicates himself for the third time.

Cast

 Nandamuri Balakrishna as Krishna Babu
 Meena as Rama
 Raasi as Shilpa
 Abbas as Vijay 
 Chandra Mohan as Chandraiah
 Kota Srinivasa Rao
 Rami Reddy as Sarva Rayudu
 Satya Prakash
 Ranganath
 Narra Venkateswara Rao as Jailor
 AVS
 M. S. Narayana
 Sivaji Raja
 Suthivelu
 Rama Prabha
 Rajitha
 Delhi Rajeswari
 Master Anand Vardhan

Soundtrack

Music composed by Koti. Music released on Supreme Music Company.

Release
Movie get positive reviews and good collections.

The film was later dubbed and released in Tamil as Veera Vamsam.

References

1999 films
1990s Telugu-language films
Films scored by Koti
Films directed by Muthyala Subbaiah